Zimin may refer to
 Zimin (surname)
 Zimin, Poland – a village
 Zimin volcano – a Kamchtka volcano
Zimin Opera in Moscow, Russia